India and Malaysia have played 123 hockey matches out of which 85 have been won by India and 17 have been won by Malaysia. The remaining 21 matches are draws.

Statistics

Major Tournament matches
The following table show India vs Malaysia in major tournaments and their finishing in the tournament:

See also
Indian field hockey team in Malaya and Singapore

References

 AZLAN SHAH 2000 HIGHLIGHTS
 India vs Malaysia (bharatiyahockey.org)

M
Field hockey in Malaysia